German submarine U-280 was a Type VIIC U-boat of Nazi Germany's Kriegsmarine during World War II.

The submarine was laid down on 30 April 1942 at the Bremer Vulkan yard at Bremen-Vegesack, launched on 4 January 1943, and commissioned on 13 February 1943 under the command of Oberleutnant zur See Walter Hungershausen.

Design
German Type VIIC submarines were preceded by the shorter Type VIIB submarines. U-280 had a displacement of  when at the surface and  while submerged. She had two shafts and two  propellers.

U-280 was fitted with five  torpedo tubes (four fitted at the bow and one at the stern), fourteen torpedoes, one  SK C/35 naval gun, 220 rounds, and two twin  C/30 anti-aircraft guns. The boat had a complement of between forty-four and sixty.

Service history
U-280 served with 8th U-boat Flotilla while training, and transferred to 3rd U-boat Flotilla on 1 August 1943 for front-line service.

On 12 October 1943 U-280 sailed from Kiel on her first and only war patrol. On 16 November she was attacked by a British Liberator aircraft of No. 86 Squadron RAF near Convoy HX 265, in position , south-west of Iceland. The first attack missed and the aircraft was hit by flak, knocking out one engine. However the bomber attacked again, sinking U-280 with depth charges. The Liberator safely returned to base on three engines.

Wolfpacks
U-280 operated with the following Wolfpacks during her career:
 Körner (30 October – 2 November 1943)
 Tirpitz 3 (2 – 8 November 1943)
 Eisenhart 3 (9 – 15 November 1943)

References

Bibliography

External links

German Type VIIC submarines
U-boats commissioned in 1943
U-boats sunk in 1943
U-boats sunk by British aircraft
World War II submarines of Germany
World War II shipwrecks in the Atlantic Ocean
1943 ships
Ships built in Bremen (state)
U-boats sunk by depth charges
Ships lost with all hands
Maritime incidents in November 1943